Plumville is a borough in Indiana County, Pennsylvania, United States. The population was 257 at the 2020 census.

Etymology

The borough was originally named for the presence of wild plum trees.

Geography
Plumville is located at  (40.793823, -79.180235).

Demographics

As of the census of 2000, there were 342 people, 123 households, and 92 families residing in the borough. The population density was 673.3 people per square mile (258.9/km2). There were 145 housing units at an average density of 285.4 per square mile (109.8/km2). The racial makeup of the borough was 98.54% White, 0.29% Native American, and 1.17% from two or more races.

There were 123 households, out of which 34.1% had children under the age of 18 living with them, 62.6% were married couples living together, 7.3% had a female householder with no husband present, and 24.4% were non-families. 22.0% of all households were made up of individuals, and 9.8% had someone living alone who was 65 years of age or older. The average household size was 2.78 and the average family size was 3.23.

In the borough the population was spread out, with 28.9% under the age of 18, 8.5% from 18 to 24, 28.7% from 25 to 44, 21.6% from 45 to 64, and 12.3% who were 65 years of age or older. The median age was 33 years. For every 100 females there were 100.0 males. For every 100 females age 18 and over, there were 100.8 males.

The median income for a household in the borough was $26,964, and the median income for a family was $28,125. Males had a median income of $24,792 versus $20,625 for females. The per capita income for the borough was $14,540. About 22.7% of families and 29.5% of the population were below the poverty line, including 44.9% of those under age 18 and 25.6% of those age 65 or over.

References

Populated places established in 1816
Boroughs in Indiana County, Pennsylvania